Kleider machen Leute (Clothes make the man or Fine feathers make fine birds) is a comic opera in a prologue and two acts by Austrian composer Alexander Zemlinsky. The libretto was written by Leo Feld, based on the 1874 novella of the same name by Gottfried Keller.

Composition and performance history
Zemlinsky started work on the opera in 1907, and completed a three-act version in 1909. He made revisions in 1910, reducing the number of acts to two. This first version was premiered at the Vienna Volksoper on 2 December 1910.

For a revival in Prague in 1922, Zemlinsky made further revisions. This second (and final) version was premiered at the Neues Deutsches Theater in Prague on 20 April 1922. The score is published by Universal Edition Vienna.

Roles

Synopsis
Prologue
On a provincial road, Wenzel Strapinski (a tailor's apprentice) is saying goodbye to two of his colleague friends. Suddenly, a magnificent carriage stops next to him. The coachman takes Wenzel to Goldach, introduces him there as a count, and then disappears.

Act 1
The citizens of Goldach admire the newcomer. The administrator and his daughter Nettchen join them. Only Melchior Böhni, who is in love with Nettchen but was rejected by her, is suspicious.

Act 2
Strapinski loves Nettchen, but is in two minds about the deceit. When he decides to leave, Nettchen stops him. His rival Böhni then exposes Strapinski as an impostor. Strapinski convinces the people of Goldach who treated him as a count that his only motive for playing along was his love for Nettchen. When he wants to leave, Nettchen stops him again, declaring that if she can not be a countess, she will gladly be the wife of a master tailor.

Instrumentation
 3 flutes (2nd and 3rd doubling piccolo), 3 oboes (3rd doubling cor anglais), 3 clarinets in B-flat/A (2nd doubling E-flat clarinet, 3rd doubling bass clarinet), 3 bassoons;
 4 horns, 3 trumpets, 4 trombones, bass tuba;
 timpani, percussion (cymbals, bass drum, side drum, triangle, tambourine, sleigh bells, rute, xylophone, glockenspiel), harp, piano, celesta;
 strings
stage orchestra: clarinet in D, clarinet in B flat, 2 horns, trumpet, bass trombone, violin

References

Further reading
 , Opera – Komponisten, Werke, Interpreten (Könemann, 2000, Dutch translation)

External links

Operas by Alexander Zemlinsky
1910 operas
1922 operas
German-language operas
Operas
Operas based on novels
Adaptations of works by Gottfried Keller